The New York Guard (NYG) is the state defense force of New York State, also called The New York State Military Reserve. Originally called the New York State Militia it can trace its lineage back to the American Revolution and the War of 1812.

The organization now has a unified command structure, while formerly it contained an Army Division and an Air Division. The missions of the New York Guard include augmentation, assistance, and support of the New York Army National Guard and New York Air National Guard respectively and aide to civil authorities in New York State. New York also has a New York Naval Militia which, with the State Guard and the Army and Air National Guards, is under the command of the Governor of New York, the Adjutant General of New York, and the Division of Military and Naval Affairs (DMNA).

The New York Guard is one of the largest organized State Defense Forces in the United States. It is historically derived from Revolutionary and Civil War era state military units that were reorganized several times in American history in response to various international and domestic crises.

Organized under the Military Law, State of New York, the New York Guard cannot be federalized at any time and cannot be deployed outside New York State without the consent of the governor.

Members of the New York Guard are entitled to many of the benefits accorded members of other components of the 'Organized Militia of the State of New York,' the legal collective term describing the New York Army and Air National Guards, New York Naval Militia and New York Guard. These include 'military leave' for employees of state or local governments and many private employers.

History
The 265th New York State Militia was a small unit of the New York line and could trace its lineage to the War of 1812. The new regiment was given the designation, 14th regiment, which is one of the oldest military organizations in the United States because of its direct lineage through various separate companies, to the militia companies of the Dutch burghers of New Amsterdam.

In Sketches of America (1818) British author Henry Bradshaw Fearon, who visited the young United States on a fact-finding mission to inform Britons considering emigration, described New York military service as he found it in New York City in August 1817: Every male inhabitant can be called out, from the age of 18 to 45, on actual military duty. During a state of peace, there are seven musters annually: the fine for non-attendance is, each time, five dollars. Commanding officers have discretionary power to receive substitutes. An instance of their easiness to be pleased was related to me by Mr. —, a tradesman of this city. He never attends the muster, but, to avoid the fine, sends some of his men, who answer to his name; the same man is not invariably his deputy on parade: in this, Mr. — suits his own convenience; sometimes the collecting clerk, sometimes one of the brewers, at others a drayman: and to finish this military pantomime, a firelock is often dispensed with, for the more convenient wartime weapon—a cudgel.

Courts-martial have the power of mitigating the fine, on the assignment of a satisfactory cause of absence, and in cases of poverty. Upon legal exemptions I cannot convey certain information. During a period of three months in the late war, martial law existed, and no substitutes were received. Aliens were not called out.

Civil War era
For more detail, see List of New York Civil War Regiments

Many units of the New York State Militia saw service in the American Civil War, after being activated into federal service by President Abraham Lincoln.

The activation of state militia by President Abraham Lincoln led to some conflict with State authorities in command of the units:

With the advent of the Civil War in April 1861, the 14th regiment saw its first war service in guarding the Brooklyn Navy Yard. By mid-April of that year, the "Brooklyn Chasseurs" were ready to leave New York for Washington D.C. Colonel Alfred Wood advised the Honorable Governor Morgan that the regiment was prepared to march and had accepted a three-year federal enlistment. However, the governor would not issue orders for the regiment to leave New York. While encamped at Fort Greene Park in Brooklyn, Colonel Wood and Congressman Moses O'Dell went to see President Lincoln to secure orders for the regiment to march to Washington. President Lincoln lost no time in issuing those orders to the 14th Brooklyn. When Governor Morgan learned that the regiment was preparing to march, he telegraphed Colonel Wood and inquired "by what authority" did he move his regiment, Colonel Wood coolly replied, "By the authority of the President of the United States."

Following the Civil War, efforts were made to link the varied military units in New York under overall headquarters. As a result of this, the 3rd Brigade, New York State Militia, came into being on August 5, 1886.

New York Guard created, 1917
On August 3, 1917, the Adjutant General of New York, in order to comply with the provisions of the State Constitution requiring that troops be available to the Governor for the protection of life and property of the citizens of New York, organized a state military force known as the New York Guard. The new force replaced the New York National Guard, drafted in the service of the United States on August 5, 1917. The force consisted of the First and Second Provisional Regiments, guarding aqueducts and other infrastructure in the southern portion (First Provisional Regiment) and the remaining parts of the state.

On January 1, 1919, the Guard numbered 22,000 in active service. After the Armistice, federalized New York National Guard Units were returned to State control.

On May 21, 1924, Babe Ruth joined the New York National Guard and was Assigned to the 104th Field Artillery in Jamaica Queens Armory.

George Herman Ruth, popularly known as "The Babe", "The Bambino", and "The Sultan of Swat", was a member of the 104th Field Artillery in Jamaica Queens. On May 21, 1924* he signed the dotted line for three years and joined the ranks of civilian soldiers.

Babe Ruth was sworn in by Colonel James Austin at the Isle of Safety in Times Square in front of a military tent used for enlistment drives. Once the enlistment papers were filled he symbolically placed them into the open jaws of a horse drawn French 75-millimeter gun. He was then immediately placed under the command of First Sergeant Adrian Jacques who was in charge of the regiment present. He served while he played in the stadium he was destined to rebuild. A May 29 Washington Post article reported that he appeared before General John Joseph Pershing at State, War and Navy building in Washington** once he was fitted and squared away.

The 104th Field Artillery underwent several changes over the years while in active duty. The unit served briefly under Federal control on November 5, 1916 for Mexican border control, then returned to state status on November 15, 1916. In addition, the unit was activated for Federal service during World War I and II. It wasn't until 1917 that the unit received its destination as the 104th Field Artillery and saw extensive service in France.

After World War I, the unit was demobilized but shortly reactivated into the New York National Guard until 1959 when it reorganized as the 104th Field Artillery Regiment. Consolidated 1 September 1992 with the 104th Field Artillery and consolidated unit designated as the 258th Field Artillery, to consist of the 1st Battalion, an element of the 42d Infantry Division.

New York Guard, 1940
With the advent of World War II, New York National Guard units were federalized and the New York Guard was created for service to the State. Commanded by Hugh Aloysius Drum, the organization took on many responsibilities normally performed by the National Guard, in addition to internal security measures such as protecting key facilities from saboteurs and developing plans to respond if such an event occurred.  Among its prominent members were boxer Jack Dempsey.

New York Guard, 2001 to present

In the wake of the September 11, 2001, terrorist attacks, the New York Guard provided security, disaster relief, legal, communications and other services to New York City and the surrounding areas in cooperation with the National Guard. During this period, Major General John F. Bahrenburg was Commander of the New York Guard (his tenure as Commander was from 1999 to 2002).

The New York Guard experienced a resurgence after the September 11, 2001 attacks. New York Guard units were activated after the attacks, performing a variety of missions, including, logistical support to forces stationed at "Ground Zero." Medical units of the Guard worked in conjunction with other DMNA forces providing care at several location including Camp Smith, in Westchester county. 

Principal occupational specialties of the New York Guard include, communications, logistics, administrative, and medical and legal services, provided in support of all components of New York State military forces, i.e., the Army and Air National Guards, Naval Militia and the New York Guard, as well as to civil authorities.

Trained and state-certified New York Guard soldiers augment and assist National Guard units in the following missions: weapons of mass destruction [WMD] decontamination – the joint New York Army National Guard / New York Air National Guard / New York Guard decontamination, or CERF, team was activated by the governor for state duty for 11 days during the 2004 Republican National Convention in New York City, Military Emergency Radio Network – the Guard is assigned to operate the MERN at various locations to ensure the free flow of information during an emergency, and search and rescue (SAR) a secondary mission to the state. New York Guard SAR teams have been mobilized, for example, in the summer of 2006 to search for a missing camper in the Adirondack Mountains preserve. Selected units and personnel of the New York Guard were called to State Active Duty with pay in response to Hurricane Irene in 2011.

2012 saw the largest deployment of the New York Guard since the September 11, 2001 attacks. Every brigade was at least partially activated for service during 'Superstorm' Sandy. New York Guard members served as equals alongside the Army National Guard, Air National Guard, and New York Naval Militia, at one point making up approximately one third of all troops in the field during a two-month deployment.

New York State Guard personnel provide training to the New York Army and Air national guards including first aid and firearms training at Camp Smith training center.

The 244th Medical Group has worked with the NY Army National Guard Medical Command (MEDCOM), augmenting National Guard personnel for in-state MEDCOM missions. These have included screening of National Guard personnel in Soldier Readiness Programs and 'reintegration' programs for both soldiers and their families upon troops' return from overseas deployment.

In addition to its SAR work as a secondary mission under the New York State Defense Emergency Act and Article 2-B of State and Local, Natural and Man-Made disasters Act, engineer units of the NY Guard 10th and 65th Brigades have built facilities for the National Guard.

Civil affairs units provide legal services to about-to-deploy troops such as wills and counseling on legal protections under federal and state law.

The New York Guard augments the capabilities of the National Guard, serving only within New York State. Guard personnel are drawn from almost every profession – from plumbers to professors, clerks and CEOs, persons with long prior military service and those without, and every part of the state.

The headquarters unit of the New York Guard is located at Camp Smith, Cortlandt Manor, New York. Camp Smith is a New York State military reservation. It is adjacent to Peekskill, New York, and about 35 miles north of New York City.

In March 2020, 90 New York Guard members were activated to support National Guard efforts at combating the coronavirus pandemic. State guardsmen were activated to serve in essential command and control roles to support operations throughout New York State. In total, over 185 New York Guard members served as part of the Joint Task Force tasked with various civil support operations including supporting testing and vaccination centers, warehouse operations, nursing home support missions, and logistic support.

Structure
Sometime in the time between 2015–2021, the guard's former brigades and groups were reorganized into commands and separate units.

The current New York Guard is currently organized as follows in June 2021:

 New York Guard (NYG HQ)
 Headquarters, New York Guard, at Camp Smith, Cortlandt Manor
 Commander, New York Guard, Brigadier General Peter P. Riley
 244th Medical Group, at Camp Smith, Cortlandt Manor
 10th Area Command (formerly 10th Brigade)
 Headquarters, 10th Area Command, at Auburn Armory, Auburn
 3rd Detachment, at Thompson Road Armory, Syracuse
 21st Detachment, at Patriot Way Armory, Rochester
 65th Detachment, at Masten Avenue Armory, Buffalo
 56th Area Command (formerly 56th Brigade)
 1st Detachment, at Peekskill Armory, Peekskill
 2nd Detachment, in Latham
 17th Detachment, at Stewart Air National Guard Base, Newburgh
 88th Area Command (formerly 88th Brigade)
 Headquarters, 88th Area Command, at Lexington Avenue Armory, Manhattan, New York City
 14th Detachment, at the United States Marine Corps Reserve Centre, Garden City
 15th Detachment, at Lexington Avenue Armory, Manhattan, New York City

Membership

Eligibility

To join, an applicant must be between 18–62 years of age, a citizen of the United States, and successfully pass a thorough medical health screening. The New York Guard (NYG) is continually recruiting new members, as the NYG role has increased and become more critical as natural disasters, civil support operations, and global conflicts have increased in scale and prevalence.

The following are some of the many positions in the New York state guard:

 Medical, including Physicians, Nurses, and counselors
 Adjutant - personnel management
 Legal Services
 Public Affairs
 Generalist
 Training Cadre
 Logistics
 Training and Operations
 Communications
 Chaplain Corps (chaplains and religious affairs specialists)
 Recruiting and Retention
 IT Specialists

Training
All New York Guard enlisted recruits, unless they have prior military experience, must attend Initial Entry Training (IET). After completion of IET at Camp Smith, soldiers may take any of the following courses based on their table of distribution and allowances (TDA)  position and rank. Officers, unless they have prior commissioned military experience, must complete the Officer's Basic Course after appointment.

Professional Development Courses 

The following Professional Development Courses are offered by the New York Guard:

 Initial Enlisted Training
 Basic Leader Course (BLC)
 Advanced Leader Course (ALC)
 Senior Leader Course (SLC)
 Sergeants Major Academy (SMA)
 Officer Candidate School (OCS)
 Basic Officer Course (BOC)
 Direct Commission Course (DCC)
 Company Grade Officer Course (CGOC)
 Field Grade Officer Course (FGOC)
 Advanced Field Grade Officer Course (AFGOC)
 State Active Duty Preparatory Course (SADPC)
 Command Track Course (CMDC)
 Recruiter Certification Course (RCC)
 Basic and Advanced Communications

Additional training
Most NYG soldiers have augmented their training by taking courses with the Federal Emergency Management Agency (FEMA), Department of Homeland Security (DHS), and various other local and state agencies. Additional training opportunities exist for NYG soldiers to work alongside other branches of the New York Military Forces.

Pay and benefits
To reward service to the nation, state and community, government and private organizations provide benefits to NY Guard soldiers. The benefits include:
 Active Military Pay when Activated by Governor for State Active Duty with pay; New York Guard members are paid at the same rate of pay for their rank or grade as their National Guard counterparts
Discounts at many civilian stores, eating establishments, and entertainment facilities with your ID
 Free New York State Hunting and Fishing License for NY state residents
 Job Protections When Called to Duty
 Paid Military Leave (for NY State and Municipal Employees)
 New York State Guard License Plate Eligibility
 Travel Allowances when Activated by the Governor for State Active Duty
 Waiver of Toll Road Fees within NY (requires a form provided by your unit)
 Protections and benefits of New York State Patriot's Plan. Many, but not all provisions are applicable to the New York Guard.

State Active Duty (SAD) 

The New York Guard can be called up by the Governor for any peacetime mission of the National Guard, such as acting as first responders and personnel support in Civil Support operations (CSO). When mobilized, New York Guard soldiers serve on State Active Duty (SAD) alongside service members from other branches of the New York Military Forces and have participated in missions such as:

 Operational support to New York Army and Air National Guards
 Emergency Medical Services (Doctors, Nurses, Mental Health and EMTs)
 Warehouse operations
 Assisting local civil authorities
 Legal support
 Support of the military community including their families
 Chaplain services

Legal protections
Businesses in New York are forbidden from adopting policies that discriminate against members of the New York Guard during the hiring process or after a person has already been hired. Individuals who enforce such policies or in any way discriminate against New York Guard employees in regards to their employment are guilty under New York law of a Class E Felony offense. Employers in the state of New York are required under New York law to grant a leave of absence to employees who are also members of the NYG whenever these employees are activated to take part in drill, training, or an emergency mission. Employers are then required to reinstate these employees to their previous positions of employment when they return from their deployment.

Awards and decorations
New York Guard personnel are eligible to receive both New York State and New York Guard awards and decorations. The New York Guard issues several awards.

New York Guard (NYG) awards:

  NYG Commander's Citation
  NYG Achievement Medal
  NYG Good Conduct Medal
  NYG Operations Support Medal
  NYG Service Ribbon
  NYG Distinguished Graduate Ribbon
  First Provisional Regiment Medal

Descriptions of New York State awards and decorations can be found at the New York State Division of Military and Naval Affairs website: dmna.ny.gov.

See also
 Brigadier General Amos M. Gailliard Jr.
 71st Infantry Regiment (New York)
 369th Infantry Regiment (United States) "Harlem Hellfighters" {formerly 15th NYNG}
 New York Wing Civil Air Patrol
 State Defense Forces
 List of United States militia units in the American Revolutionary War

References

External links
 The New York Guard Recruiting website
 Official NY State Homepage of the New York Guard
 New York Civil War Regiments online
 List of New York Military Units in the Civil War
 History of the NY State Militia 14th Regiment from Brooklyn
 20th New York State Militia - Ulster Guard

Military in New York (state)
State defense forces of the United States
 Guard
1917 establishments in New York (state)
Military units and formations established in 1917